The Colin Range is a mountain range of the Canadian Rockies located directly northeast of Jasper townsite in Jasper National Park, Canada.

This range includes the following mountains and peaks:

References 

Mountain ranges of Alberta
Ranges of the Canadian Rockies